This is a list of named geological features on Rhea, the second largest moon of Saturn. Planetary features are approved by the International Astronomical Union's (IAU) Working Group for Planetary System Nomenclature (WGPSN).

Catenae 

A catena  is a crater chain.

Chasmata 

Rhean chasms are called chasmata. They are named after sacred places in world mythologies.

Craters  

Rhean craters are named after figures from the mythologies of mostly non-European cultures. As of 2017, there are 128 named craters.

back to top

Fossae 

A fossa is a long, narrow depression.

Lineae 

A linea is a long marking on a planet or moon's surface.

See also 

 List of craters in the Solar System
 List of quadrangles on Rhea

References

External links 
 USGS: Rhea nomenclature

Rhea (moon)
Rhea (moon)
Rhea